BX Boötis is a star in the northern constellation of Boötes. It is a dim star near the lower limit of visibility to the naked eye, having a nominal apparent visual magnitude of 6.35. At that distance, the visual magnitude of the star is diminished by an extinction of 0.13 due to interstellar dust. It is moving closer with a heliocentric radial velocity of −11 km/s.

The spectrum has very weak lines of helium but displays strong overabundances of silicon and all of the heavier elements except nickel. It is classified as an Alpha² Canum Venaticorum variable with a magnitude that varies from 6.33 to 6.41 over a period of 2.88756 days.

BX Boötis is 235 million years old with a projected rotational velocity of 30 km/s. It has 2.7 times the mass of the Sun and 2.5 times the Sun's radius. The star is radiating around 72 times the Sun's luminosity from its photosphere at an effective temperature of 9,164 K.

References

External links
 CCDM J15006+4717
 HR 5597
 Image BX Boötis

A-type main-sequence stars
Ap stars
Alpha2 Canum Venaticorum variables

Boötes
Durchmusterung objects
133029
073454
5597
Bootis, BX